Sheffield Tunes is a German record label, and a sublabel of Kontor Records, formed in 2000 by H.P. Baxxter, Rick J. Jordan and Jens Thele. The first album released by Sheffield Tunes was Sheffield (Released at 26 June 2000), and the first single was "I'm Your Pusher", by Scooter. Sheffield Tunes also owns the Sheffield Jumpers.

Artists 
Scooter
Sheffield Jumpers

German record labels